Chippewa Boots, originally  known as Chippewa Shoe Manufacturing Company, is an American manufacturer of footwear, principally men's work and recreational boots.  It also manufactures a limited line of heavy and casual shoes, and some women's footwear.  It was founded in Chippewa Falls, Wisconsin, in 1901.

Acquisition
In 1984 it was acquired by Justin Brands, which was in turn acquired by Berkshire Hathaway in August 2000. Other companies under Justin Brands include Justin Boots, Justin Original Workboots, Nocona Boots, and Tony Lama Boots.

References

External links

Waterproof Work Boots
Custom Wood Boot Jack

Boots
Manufacturing companies based in Wisconsin
Shoe companies of the United States
Berkshire Hathaway